The Razor's Edge is a studio album by English jazz bassist Dave Holland, released in 1987 via the ECM label. It features Holland’s quintet featuring alto saxophonist Steve Coleman, trumpeter Kenny Wheeler, trombonist Robin Eubanks and drummer ”Smitty” Smith.

Background
The record is the last of three albums recorded by a quintet line-up. Two tunes from this album have been reprised on later recordings—both "Blues For C.M." and the title track were featured on Holland's first big band release, What Goes Around.

Reception
The Allmusic review by Scott Yanow awarded the album 4½ stars, stating, "The group's three ECM releases are well worth exploring, and this set gives listeners a strong example of their work".

Track listing
All compositions by Dave Holland except as indicated
 "Brother Ty" (Doug Hammond) - 4:34
 "Vedana" - 4:53
 "The Razor's Edge" - 7:52
 "Blues for C.M." - 9:15
 "Vortex" (Steve Coleman) - 8:11
 "5 Four Six" (Kenny Wheeler) - 4:26
 "Wights Waits for Weights" (Coleman) - 5:25
 "Figit Time" (Hammond) - 6:17
Recorded at Tonstudio Bauer, Ludwigsburg in February 1987

Personnel
Steve Coleman – alto saxophone
Kenny Wheeler – trumpet, flugelhorn, cornet
Robin Eubanks – trombone
Dave Holland – double bass
Marvin "Smitty" Smith – drums

References

Dave Holland albums
1987 albums
Albums produced by Manfred Eicher